Yeovil is a town and civil parish in the district of South Somerset, England. The population of Yeovil at the last census (2021) was 49,698. The aircraft and defence industries which developed in the 20th century made it a target for bombing in the Second World War; they are still major employers. Yeovil Country Park, which includes Ninesprings, is one of several open spaces with educational, cultural and sporting facilities. Religious sites include the 14th-century Church of St John the Baptist. The town is on the A30 and A37 roads and has two railway stations.

History
Archaeological surveys have yielded Palaeolithic burial and settlement sites mainly to the south of the modern town, particularly in Hendford, where a Bronze Age golden torc (twisted collar) was found.

Yeovil is on the main Roman road from Dorchester to the Fosse Way at Ilchester. The route of the old road is aligned with the A37 from Dorchester, Hendford Hill, Rustywell, across the Westland site, to Larkhill Road and Vagg Lane, rejoining the A37 at the Halfway House pub in the Ilchester Road. The Westland site has evidence of a small Roman town. There were several Roman villas (estates) in the area. Finds have been made at East Coker, West Coker and Lufton.

Medieval times
Yeovil was first named in a Saxon charter dated 880 as Gifle. It derives from the Celtic river-name gifl "forked river", an earlier name of the River Yeo.

The estate was bequeathed in the will of King Alfred the Great to his youngest son Aethelweard. It was recorded in the Domesday Book as Givele, a thriving market community. The parish of Yeovil was part of the Stone Hundred. After the Norman Conquest, the manor, later known as Hendford, was granted to the Count of Eu and his tenant Hugh Maltravers, whose descendants became Earls of Arundel and held the lordship until 1561. In 1205 it was granted a charter by King John. By the 14th century, the town had gained the right to elect a portreeve.

The Black Death exacted a heavy toll, killing about half the population.

In 1499 a major fire destroyed many wooden, thatch-roofed buildings in the town. Yeovil suffered further fires in 1620 and 1643.

Ownership
After the dissolution of the monasteries the lord of the manor was the family of John Horsey of Clifton Maybank from 1538 to 1610 followed by the Phelips family until 1846 when it passed to the Harbins of Newton Surmaville. Babylon Hill across the River Yeo to the south east of the town was the site of a minor skirmish, the Battle of Babylon Hill, during the English Civil War, which resulted in the Earl of Bedford's Roundheads forcing back Sir Ralph Hopton's Cavaliers to Sherborne.

Development

In the 1800s Yeovil was a glove-making centre, whose the population expanded fast. In the mid-19th century it became linked to the rest of Britain by a complex of railway lines, with competition between the  broad gauge lines of the Great Western Railway (GWR) and the  standard gauge lines of the London and South Western Railway (LSWR). In 1853 the Great Western Railway line was opened between Taunton and Yeovil.

As an associate of the GWR, this was a broad-gauge line. The GWR itself opened Yeovil Pen Mill railway station on the east side of the town as part of its route from London on 1 September 1856, extended to Weymouth on 1 January 1857), and the original line from Taunton connected with this. The LSWR route from London reached Hendford on 1 June 1860, but a month later the town was by-passed by an extension of the LSWR to Exeter. On 1 June 1861 passenger trains were withdrawn from Hendford and transferred to a new, more central, Yeovil Town railway station.

In 1854, the town gained borough status and had its first mayor. In the early 20th century Yeovil had around 11,000 inhabitants and was dominated by the defence industry, making it a target of German raids during World War II. The worst bombing was in 1940 and continued until 1942. During that time 107 high-explosive bombs fell on the town, 49 people died, 68 houses were totally destroyed and 2,377 damaged.

Industrial businesses developed round the Hendford railway goods station to such a degree that a small  was opened on 2 May 1932 for passengers, but the growth of road transport and a desire to rationalise the rail network led to half of the railway stations in Yeovil being closed in 1964. First to go was Hendford Halt, closed on 15 June along with the line to Taunton, then  closed on 2 October. Long-distance trains from Pen Mill were withdrawn on 11 September 1961, leaving only  with a service to London, but the service between there and Pen Mill, the two remaining stations, was also withdrawn from 5 May 1968.

As a former centre of Britain's leather industry, the town is post-industrial in character. Journalist John Harris, for instance, described the towns Taunton, Yeovil and Bridgwater as a "post-industrial, hardscrabble place that contain[s] 19 of the council wards in the 20% of English areas classed as the most deprived."

Governance

Officially designated as Yeovil Municipal Borough in 1854, the town continued to lend its name to the area with the creation of the local government district of Yeovil on 1 April 1974, with the merging several neighbouring rural and urban districts, which is today known as South Somerset. Some suburbs fall within the civil parishes of Yeovil Without and Brympton. 

Yeovil still has a town council, which took over the functions of the Charter Trustees in 1982. It has responsibility for the management of recreational and leisure facilities, open spaces and play areas. In 2005, Yeovil Town Council became the first large council in Somerset to be awarded Quality Town Council status. Yeovil Town Council is based at the Town House.

There are five electoral wards covering Yeovil.

Yeovil is a county constituency represented in the House of Commons of the Parliament of the United Kingdom. It elects one Member of Parliament (MP). It covers the Somerset towns of Yeovil, Chard, Crewkerne and Ilminster. Until 1983 Somerset was split into four constituencies and Yeovil constituency also covered Ilchester, Martock and Somerton, but these were moved into the new constituency of Somerton and Frome. From the 2010 general election, Yeovil constituency regained Ilchester, to equalise the constituency populations. The Boundary Commission for England estimate that the electorate of Yeovil constituency after the boundary changes to be 77,049. The current MP is Marcus Fysh of the Conservative Party.

Geography

It lies in the centre of the Yeovil Scarplands, a natural region of England. The suburbs include Summerlands, Hollands, Houndstone, Preston Plucknett, Penn Mill, New Town, Hendford, Old Town, Forest Hill, Abbey Manor, Great Lyde. Outlying villages include East Coker, West Coker, Hardington Mandeville, Evershot, Halstock, Stoford, Barwick, Sutton Bingham, Mudford and Yetminster. Other nearby villages include Bradford Abbas, Thornford Corscombe, Montacute (with Montacute House) and Pendomer. The village of Brympton, now almost a suburb of Yeovil, contains the medieval manor of Brympton d'Evercy. Tintinhull, also close to Yeovil, features the National Trust-owned Tintinhull House and Gardens.

Ninesprings Country Park is in the south-east near Penn Hill, linked by a cycle way along the route of the old railway to Riverside Walk, Wyndham Hill and Summerhouse Hill, forming the  Yeovil Country Park.

Climate
Like the rest of South West England, Yeovil has a temperate climate generally wetter and milder than the rest of the country.

The south-west of England is in a favoured location for the Azores high pressure zone, when it extends north-eastwards towards the UK, particularly in summer. However, convective cloud often forms inland, especially near hills, reducing the number of hours of sunshine, whose annual average annual is about 1,700 hours.

Rainfall tends to be associated with Atlantic depressions or with convection. The Atlantic depressions are more vigorous in autumn and winter, when most of the rain that falls in the south-west is from that source. November to March have the highest mean wind speeds, with June to August having the lightest winds. The predominant wind direction is from the south-west.

Demography
At the 2011 census, the population of the built-up area (which extends beyond Yeovil civil parish to include the urban parts of Yeovil Without and Brympton parishes) was 45,784, forming 28% of the population of South Somerset district.

Economy

AgustaWestland manufactures helicopters in Yeovil, and Normalair Garratt, (Honeywell) builder of aircraft oxygen systems, is also based there.

Yeovil's role as a centre of the aircraft and defence industries continued into the 21st century, despite attempts to diversify and the creation of industrial estates. In January 1986 a proposed sale of Westland Helicopters to the US Sikorsky Aircraft group led to the Westland affair, a crisis in the Thatcher government, resignation of Michael Heseltine as Secretary of State for Defence, and two weeks later of Secretary of State for Trade and Industry Leon Brittan, who admitted leaking a governmental law officer's letter harshly critical of Heseltine. AgustaWestland, created through the acquisition of Westland by Finmeccanica in 2000, remains the main employer in Yeovil.

British defence giant BAE Systems also runs a site producing high-integrity networked software, mainly for the armed forces.

Screwfix Direct based in Houndstone started life as Woodscrew Supply Company in 1979. It is now a subsidiary of Kingfisher plc. The company warehouse relocated to Stoke-on-Trent after failing to gain planning permission for expansion.

Quedam Shopping Centre has some 45 shops: the usual high-street chains, several independents, and a multi-storey car park with about 650 spaces.

In 2015, leather manufacturer Pittards bought back its 1964 purpose-built tannery in Sherborne Road, Yeovil.

Landmarks

One symbol of Yeovil is "Jack the Treacle Eater", a folly consisting of a small archway topped by a turret with a statue on top. This stands in the village of Barwick, just to the south of the town. The hamstone Abbey Farm House was built about 1420 by John Stourton II, known as Jenkyn, as was Abbey Barn.

Hendford Manor in the town centre was built about 1720 and has since been converted into offices. It is a Grade II* listed building. Newton Surmaville is a small park and house also known as Newton House, built in 1608–1612 for Robert Harbin, a Yeovil merchant. It is a Grade I listed building.

Yeovil's two theatres are the Octagon, and the Swan, now a ten-screen cinema and 18-lane tenpin bowling alley.

Yeovil District Hospital NHS Foundation Trust provides local health services.

Yeovil Railway Centre is a small museum created in 1993 in response to British Rail's decision to remove the turntable from Yeovil Junction. About  of track along the Clifton Maybank spur is used for demonstration trains.

Transport
The two railway stations serve separate lines. Yeovil Pen Mill is on the Bristol to Weymouth line, served by Great Western Railway services, and Yeovil Junction is on the London Waterloo to Exeter line served by South Western Railway.

Bus services linking the centre to Yeovil Junction are run by South West Coaches except on Sundays and bank holidays, when a service is operated by First West of England. The latter firm also operates a service to Pen Mill,

Yeovil has bus services from First West of England, First Hampshire & Dorset, South West Coaches, Stagecoach South West and Damory Coaches, and coach services from National Express, Berrys Coaches and South West Tours. Many of the listed services serve Yeovil College. All bus routes except First West of England local routes towards the Western side of the town serve Yeovil bus station. North Dorset Community Accessible Transport (NORDCAT) provides a bookable service to places without other forms of public transport.

The town is on the A30 – the main route between London and the South West until it was supplanted by the A303 to its north. Yeovil is also on the mainly single-carriageway A37 north–south road between Bristol and Weymouth.

Education
Further education in Yeovil is mainly offered by Yeovil College, with land-based studies available at a Yeovil centre of Bridgwater College, and some provision through private providers. The town also has a higher education centre, University Centre Yeovil, whose main degree-awarding body is Bournemouth University, with University of the West of England offering some courses.

Secondary education in Yeovil is provided by four schools: Westfield Academy on Stiby Road; Preston School, with actress Sarah Parish among its past pupils; and Bucklers Mead Academy with past pupils including Sir Ian Botham.

Places of worship

The Anglican Church of St John The Baptist dates from the late 14th century. Its -high tower is in four stages, with set-back offset corner buttresses. It is capped by openwork balustrading matching the 19th-century parapets. There are two-light late 14th-century windows on all sides at bell-ringing and bell-chamber levels, the latter having fine pierced stonework grilles. There is a stair turret to the north-west corner, with a weather vane termination. The church is a Grade I listed building.

Yeovil has a Roman Catholic Holy Ghost Church, three Methodist churches (Preston Road, St Marks, Chelston Avenue, and Vicarage Street), a Baptist church in South Street, the Salvation Army, Elim Pentecostal Church, Yeovil Community Church (Evangelical, based at The GateWay), Yeovil Family Church (New Frontiers), and several other Anglican churches. 

There is a mosque on Sherborne Road which was opened to worshippers in May 2017.

Sport

The town's football team, Yeovil Town F.C., plays in green and white livery at Huish Park, and currently competes in the National League. Known as the "Glovers" (referring to the town's glove-making past), it was founded in 1895 and won, as Football Conference (the then name of National League) champions in 2003, promotion to the English Football League for the first time in its history. It had achieved numerous FA Cup victories over Football League sides in the past 50 years, and since joining the League has won promotion again – as League Two champions in 2005 and League One play-off winners in 2013. However, the stay in tier 2 of English football only lasted for a season. In women's football, Yeovil Town L.F.C. was founded in 1990 and won promotion to England's highest tier, the FA Women's Super League, in 2016.

Other football teams in the town include Westland's Sports Football Club, which plays at Alvington Lane, and Pen Mill Football Club.

Yeovil Olympiads Athletics Club, founded in 1969, has produced many international athletes. The first was Eric Berry, who came 6th in the 1973 European Juniors in the hammer event. Olympians who started with the club include Max Robertson and Gary Jennings, both 400-metre hurdlers.

Yeovil is home to Ivel Barbarians Rugby Club, formed in 1995 by a merger of the Yeovil and Westlands clubs. South Somerset Warriors formed in 2010 and played in the South West Division of the Rugby League Conference until it folded in 2011.

The Goldenstones Pool and Leisure Centre provides a  swimming pool, a teaching pool, a gym, sauna, steam room, spectator area and workout studio. Preston Sports Centre has undergone an £800,000 refurbishment, which included adding a gym and dance studio.

In late July 2007, South Somerset District Council plans were made public by the Western Gazette to build a £21-million Yeovil Sports Zone on Yeovil Recreation Ground, which has been a popular open green space with the local community for over 70 years. Residents fought to protect it, leading to rejection of the proposals in 2009, and further consultations in 2010.

The recreation space known as Mudford Rec was frequented by England cricket star Ian Botham during a childhood stay in Yeovil. Another regeneration project would have meant demolishing Foundry House, a former glove factory, but a local campaign led to this becoming a listed building. It will now be converted into a restaurant and offices and new shop and houses built on the surrounding site.

Popular culture
Yeovil is known in Thomas Hardy's Wessex as "Ivell". It is also one of three main locations in John Cowper Powys's 1929 novel, Wolf Solent.

Yeovil is the location for the fictional School of Lifemanship in a series of novels by Stephen Potter: Gamesmanship (1947), Lifemanship (1950), One-Upmanship (1952), Supermanship (1958), Anti-Woo (1965) and The Complete Golf Gamesmanship (1968). These were adapted for the 1960 film School for Scoundrels, starring Alastair Sim, Terry-Thomas, Ian Carmichael and Irene Handl. Later they were adapted by Barry Took for a BBC TV comedy series, One-Upmanship (1974–1978), starring Richard Briers and Peter Jones.

Local band The Chesterfields released a single called "Last train to Yeovil" and pop band Bubblegum Splash a song called "18:10 to Yeovil Junction". The folk band Show of Hands wrote a song called "Yeovil Town" about violence and crime they experienced after playing a small gig in Yeovil.

Yeovil is the home town of Gary Strang (played by Martin Clunes) in the TV comedy Men Behaving Badly.

International tie
Johannesburg, South Africa, has a suburb called Yeoville, so named in 1890 by Thomas Yeo Sherwell, a native of Yeovil in England. He named the streets after his sons, friends and business associates.

Notable people

Among several notable Yeovil people, Robert Harbin, born in 1526, was a mercer by profession, who lived and died in Yeovil and is buried in St John the Baptist Church. His house, Newton Surmaville, was completed on the edge of the town in 1612. He was granted a coat of arms in May 1612 and given the title "Gentleman", but not knighted. Stukeley Westcott was an early American settler (17th century) and co-founder with Roger Williams and 11 others, of Providence, Rhode Island (1636), an early American asylum of religious freedom.

Alison Adburgham (1912–1997), social historian and fashion journalist, was born in Yeovil, as were film historian William K. Everson in 1929, and traditionalist Catholic writer and public figure Michael T. Davies in 1936.

Sportspeople from Yeovil include Luton Town defender Martin Cranie, Olympic pentathlete Sam Weale, and his twin brother Chris Weale, who is a former professional goalkeeper. Heather Stanning, a gold-medallist rower in the 2012 Olympic Games, was born in Yeovil.

England Women's Rugby World Cup winner 2014 and freedom of the town holder Marlie Packer is from Yeovil.

The arts are represented by Jim Cregan, a guitarist with Steve Harley & Cockney Rebel, musician John Parish, and his younger sister, actress Sarah Parish. Artist Flora Twort was born in Yeovil in 1893.

See also

RNAS Yeovilton (HMS Heron)

References

External links

Yeovil Town Council
Economy of Yeovil

 
Towns in South Somerset
Civil parishes in Somerset
Market towns in Somerset